Siebs's law is a Proto-Indo-European (PIE) phonological rule named after the German linguist Theodor Siebs. According to this law, if an s-mobile is added to a root that starts with a voiced or aspirated stop, that stop is allophonically devoiced.

Compare:
PIE  > Latin fragor, 
but  > PIE  > Sanskrit sphūrjati.

Discussion
Siebs proposed this law in the Zeitschrift für vergleichende Sprachforschung auf dem Gebiete der indogermanischen Sprachen, as Anlautstudien (Berlin, 1904, 37: 277–324). Oswald Szemerényi has rejected this rule, explaining that it is untenable and cites the contradiction present in Avestan zdī from PIE  "be!" as counterproof (Szemerényi 1999: 144).

References
 
 

Sound laws
Proto-Indo-European language